Nemalion helminthoides is a small marine alga in the division Rhodophyta.

Description
This is a fairly large erect alga which grows to no more than 0.4 m long.  The frond is erect with a solid axis. It is very mucilaginous and with few branches which are elongate growing from a discoid base. The central strand is composed of filaments intricately entangled.

Habitat
Midlittoral, epilithic and on BalanusPatella.

Reproduction
The life-history is not fully confirmed. However carpospores and tetrasporangia have been recorded.

Distribution
Generally distributed around the European coast and the Atlantic coast of North America.

Note
The spelling of the specific name is in older references spelt without the first letter "h". However helminthoides is considered more correct.

References

Nemaliales